Graham Jolliffe (born 1937, St Germans, Cornwall, UK) is a British illustrator and cartoonist.  His work includes Chloe & Co in the Daily Mail, and the Wicked Willie character that first appeared in the book, Man's Best Friend in 1984. He uses ink, and colours his work using the TRIA marker system from Letraset.

Early life
He attended The King's School, Peterborough, where R.K. Jolliffe was later Head Boy.

Career

Jolliffe started as an advertising copywriter with Maxwell Clarke on Fleet Street but then became a cartoonist and illustrator; for example illustrating One Man and His Bog by Barry Pilton in 1986. He became Cartoonist of the Year in 1997 and has worked for the Boase Massimi Pollitt (BMP) agency.

He wrote the Wicked Willie books with Peter Mayle.

He illustrated the Easy Peasy People series with the late Roger Hargreaves.

Personal life
He is married to Nikki, and they have three children and live in Hambleden, near Henley. He is friends with Sir Alan Parker, the film director.

External links
 Illustrationweb
 
 

1937 births
British cartoonists
People from Peterborough
People educated at The King's School, Peterborough
Living people
Date of birth missing (living people)